Nick Hannah (born March 10, 1981) is a former American football linebacker. He was signed by the Indianapolis Colts as an undrafted free agent in 2005. He played college football at Eastern Oregon.

Hannah has also been a member of the Tri-Cities Fever, BC Lions, Arizona Adrenaline, Toronto Argonauts, and California Redwoods.

Referencess

External links
Official website

1981 births
Living people
People from East Wenatchee, Washington
Players of American football from Washington (state)
American football linebackers
American players of Canadian football
Canadian football linebackers
Eastern Oregon Mountaineers football players
Indianapolis Colts players
Amsterdam Admirals players
BC Lions players
Arizona Adrenaline players
Toronto Argonauts players
Sacramento Mountain Lions players
Tri-Cities Fever players